Alex Lawson and Li Zhe were the defending champions but only Li chose to defend his title, partnering Hugo Nys. Li lost in the final to André Göransson and Sem Verbeek.

Göransson and Verbeek won the title after defeating Li and Nys 6–2, 6–4 in the final.

Seeds

Draw

References

External links
 Main draw

Challenger Banque Nationale de Granby - Men's Doubles
2019 Men's Doubles